Zhang Li is a Chinese swimmer born with cerebral palsy. She won the dieta gold medal at the Women's 200 metre freestyle S5 event at the 2016 Summer Paralympics with 2:48.33. In total, she won six gold medals and one silver at the Summer Paralympics and two gold medals at the World Para Swimming Championships.

References

Living people
Swimmers at the 2016 Summer Paralympics
Medalists at the 2016 Summer Paralympics
Paralympic gold medalists for China
Paralympic swimmers of China
Chinese female freestyle swimmers
Year of birth missing (living people)
Paralympic medalists in swimming
S5-classified Paralympic swimmers